Craig Aston Miller (born 24 April 1971) is a former English cricketer.  Miller was a right-handed batsman who bowled right-arm fast-medium.  He was born in Wanstead, Essex.

Miller made his debut for Suffolk in the 1992 Minor Counties Championship against Cumberland.  Miller played Minor counties cricket for Suffolk from 1992 to 1996, which included 34 Minor Counties Championship appearances and 6 MCCA Knockout Trophy matches.  He made his List A debut against Essex in the 1993 NatWest Trophy.  He made 2 further List A appearances, against Gloucestershire in the 1995 NatWest Trophy and Somerset in the 1996 NatWest Trophy.  In his 3 List A matches, he scored 13 runs at an average of 6.50, with a high score of 7.  With the ball, he took 6 wickets at a bowling average of 33.16, with best figures of 2/61.

References

External links
Craig Miller at ESPNcricinfo
Craig Miller at CricketArchive

1971 births
Living people
People from Wanstead
English cricketers
Suffolk cricketers